This is a list of aqueducts.

Africa

Botswana
North-South Carrier

Egypt
Aqueduct of the Nile (historic)
Bahr Yussef
Fresh Water Canal
Ibrahimiya Canal
Mahmoudiyah Canal
Sadat Canal (see also New Valley Project)
Sweet Water Canal

Libya
Great Man-Made River

South Africa

Sudan
Gezira Scheme

Tunisia
Zaghouan Aqueduct

Asia

Sri Lanka
Ella ,Kandy

China
Big Western Line (proposed)
Irtysh–Karamay–Ürümqi Canal
South-North Water Transfer Project (proposed)

India
Indira Gandhi Canal
Mahi Aqueduct
Mathur Aqueduct
Solani River Aqueduct
Peddavagu Aqueduct

Israel
National Water Carrier of Israel

Japan
 Nanzen-ji Temple, Kyoto

Jordan
Gadara Aqueduct

Kazakhstan
Irtysh–Karaganda Canal

Taiwan
Chianan Canal

Turkmenistan
Karakum Canal
Main Turkmen Canal (unfinished)

Australia and Oceania

Australia

Barwon Sewer Aqueduct
Boothtown Aqueduct
Mount Evelyn Aqueduct (defunct)

New Zealand

The unique Tokaanu Tailrace Bridge, a combined road and water bridge crosses a power canal of the Tongariro Power Scheme in the North Island of New Zealand. State Highway 41 travels along the top of this bridge, with the Tokaanu Stream, an important trout spawning stream, running under the road surface.

Europe

Croatia
Aqueduct of Diocletian

Cyprus
Kamares Aqueduct
Nicosia aqueduct

France

Aqueduc de Louveciennes
Aqueduct of Luynes 
Aqueduct of the Gier
Barbegal aqueduct and mills
Pont du Gard 
Aqueduct of la Minette, Rennes
Millau Viaduct,Southern France

Germany
Eifel Aqueduct

Greece
Aqueduct of Kavala
Roman and Medieval Aqueducts of Patras

Ireland
Blundell Aqueduct
Leinster Aqueduct
Whitworth Aqueduct

Italy

Aqua Augusta (Naples)
Aqueduct of Vanvitelli

Malta
 Wignacourt Aqueduct
 Gozo Aqueduct

Montenegro
Bar Aqueduct

Netherlands

Flevoland 
 Naviduct

Friesland 

 Aquaduct De Geeuw
 Ee Aquaduct
 Galamadammen Aquaduct
 Houkesloot Aquaduct 
 Jeltesloot Aquaduct
 Leppa Akwadukt
 Prinses Margriettunnel
 Aquaduct Mid-Fryslân
 Aquaduct Langdeel

Gelderland 
 Aquaduct Veluwemeer

North Holland 
 Aquaduct Ringvaart Haarlemmermeer
 Floriaduct

Overijssel 
 Aquaduct op het landgoed

South Holland 
 Alphen-aquaduct
 Cortlandt-aquaduct
 Gaag-aquaduct
 Gouwe-aquaduct
 Vlietaquaduct
 Waterdrager
 Molenviergang (Aarlanderveen)

Utrecht 
 Rien Nouwen Aquaduct

Zeeland 
 Dampoort-aquaduct

North Macedonia

Skopje Aqueduct

Portugal
Águas Livres Aqueduct
Amoreira Aqueduct
Santa Clara Aqueduct

Russia
Rostokino Aqueduct

Spain

Aqueduct of Albatana
Aqueduct of Algeciras
Aqueduct of Segovia
Acueducto de los Milagros
Les Ferreres Aqueduct
Roman aqueducts of Toledo

Sweden
 Håverud Aqueduct

Turkey
Aqueduct of Valens
İncekaya Aqueduct
Lamas Aqueduct
Olba Aqueduct

United Kingdom

Devonport Leat
Drake's Leat
Laleham Aqueduct
New River Aqueduct
Staines Reservoirs Aqueduct

North America

Canada
Brooks Aqueduct (defunct)
Canal de l'Aqueduc
Greater Winnipeg Water District Aqueduct
Sooke Flowline (defunct)

United States

Arizona

Arizona Canal
Central Arizona Project (Granite Reef Aqueduct)
Consolidated Canal
Gila Gravity Canal
Grand Canal (Arizona)
South Canal (Arizona)
Tempe Canal
Western Canal (Arizona)

California

All-American Canal
California Aqueduct
Coachella Canal
Colorado River Aqueduct
Corning Canal
Delta-Mendota Canal
Folsom South Canal
Friant-Kern Canal
Hetch Hetchy Aqueduct
Los Angeles Aqueduct
Madera Canal
Mokelumne Aqueduct
North Bay Aqueduct
San Diego Aqueduct
La Mesa-Sweetwater Branch
South Bay Aqueduct
Tehama-Colusa Canal

Idaho
Gooding Milner canal
Twin Falls Main Canal

Indiana
Indiana Central Canal
Duck Creek Aquaduct, Metamora, Indiana

Massachusetts
Chicopee Valley Aqueduct
Cochituate Aqueduct (historic)
Cosgrove Aqueduct
MetroWest Water Supply Tunnel
Quabbin Aqueduct
Wild Cat Aqueduct
Middlesex Canal
Echo Bridge

New Mexico

Azotea Tunnel
Belen Canal
East Side Canal
Leasburg Canal
Navajo Indian Irrigation Project
Peralta Canal
Rincon Valley Main Canal
West Side Canal

New York
Catskill Aqueduct
Croton Aqueduct (historic)
Delaware Aqueduct
New Croton Aqueduct

Puerto Rico 

 San Juan Waterworks (historic)

Texas

American Canal
Franklin Canal
Mission San Juan Aqueduct
Phantom Lake Canal
Riverside Canal
Tornillo Canal

Washington, D.C.
Washington Aqueduct

Washington State
Multiple aqueducts for the Columbia Basin Project

Mexico

Alamo Canal (disused)
Aqueduct of Padre Tembleque
Chapultepec Aqueduct (ruins)
Chihuahua Aqueduct
Colorado River-Tijuana Aqueduct
Morelia Aqueduct
Querétaro Aqueduct
Saltillo Aqueduct
Tecoatl irrigation system (ruins)
Tepotzotlán Aqueduct
Zacatecas Aqueduct

South America

Brazil
Carioca Aqueduct

Colombia
 Aqueduct of Bogotá Savanna

Peru
Puquios (historic, but still in use)

References

Aqueducts
Aqueducts
Aqueducts